Beaver is a surname. Notable people with the surname include:

Beverly Beaver (disambiguation), several people
 Bev Beaver (athlete) (born 1947), Mohawk Canadian athlete
 Beverly Barton (1946–2011), American author born Beverly Marie Beaver
Black Beaver (1806–1880), Delaware / Lenape chief, guide, rancher
Bruce Beaver (1928–2004), Australian poet
David Beaver, American linguist and philosopher
Diane E. Beaver, American lawyer and United States Army officer
Edmund Beaver (1911–1993) Australian rugby league footballer
Francis Beaver (1824–1887), Australian politician
Fred Beaver (1911–1980) American painter
Hugh Beaver (1890–1967) British engineer and businessman
Isidor George Beaver (1859–1934), Australian architect
Jack A. Beaver (1918–2012), American politician
Jack Beaver (1900–1963), British film score composer
James A. Beaver (1837–1914), Pennsylvania governor
Jim Beaver (born 1950), American actor
Josh Beaver (born 1993) Australian swimmer
Justin Beaver (born 1984), American football player
Kevin Beaver (born 1977) American criminologist and academic
King Beaver (d. 1769 or 1771) Lenape tribal chief
Martin Beaver (born 1967), Canadian violinist
Olga Beaver (1942–2012), Czech-American mathematician
Paul Beaver (1926–1975) American musician
Philip Beaver (1766–1813), Royal Navy officer
R. Perry Beaver (1938–2014), American Muscogee leader
Roger A. Beaver, biologist who studied Nepenthes pitcher plants
Ryan Beaver (born 1984), American singer-songwriter
Samson Beaver (1877–1908), Canadian explorer
Sandy Beaver (1883–1969), American football player
Sigourney Beaver, American drag queen
Tessa Beaver (1932–2018), English painter and illustrator
Wilfred Beaver (1897–1986), British flying ace
William Beaver (disambiguation), several people
William H. Beaver (born 1940), accounting researcher and educator
William T. Beaver (1933–2020), American medical researcher and educator

See also
Beaver (disambiguation)#Fictional characters
Beavers (surname)
Julian Beever (born c. 1959), British chalk artist

Surnames from nicknames